Angus Cameron McLeod (11 January 1890 – 16 May 1917) was a Scottish professional footballer who played as a forward in the Scottish League for Aberdeen.

Personal life 
McLeod served in the Gordon Highlanders during the First World War and was holding the rank of acting lance corporal when he was killed in France on 16 May 1917. He is commemorated on the Arras Memorial.

Career statistics

References 

Scottish footballers
1917 deaths
British Army personnel of World War I
British military personnel killed in World War I
1890 births
Gordon Highlanders soldiers
Scottish Football League players
Caledonian F.C. players
Footballers from Inverness
Association football forwards
Aberdeen F.C. players
Highland Football League players